Matthías Árnason Mathiesen (6 August 1931 in Hafnarfjörður – 9 November 2011 in Hafnarfjörður) was an Icelandic politician and former minister. He was the Minister of Finance of Iceland from 1974 to 1978.

References

External links 
 Non auto-biography of Matthías Árnason Mathiesen on the parliament website

1931 births
2011 deaths
Finance ministers of Iceland
Matthias Arnason Mathiesen
People from Hafnarfjörður
Independence Party (Iceland) politicians